Sådan er Jeg Osse or That's Me, Too is a 1980 Danish drama film directed and written by Lise Roos. It was the last film to star Inger Stender.

Cast
 Stine Sylvestersen as Stine 
 Avi Sagild as Stines mor 
 Maria Tagliani as Stines lillesøster 
 Thomas Roos as Stines lillebror 
 Preben Kaas as Stines far 
 Anne-Lise Gabold as Stines fars nye kone 
 Eline Roos as Stines fars nye datter 
 Tobias Hansen as Stines fars nye søn 
 Inger Stender as Stines mormor 
 Morten Krøgholt as Stines ven 
 Rasmus Kærså as Stines ven 
 Gitte Schödt as Stines veninde 
 Sussie Egesten as Stines veninde 
 Jakob Olsen as Den ene venindes fyr 
 Søren Thomsen as Den voksne 
 Birgit Kragh as Stines gamle lærerinde 
 Kirsten Olesen as Bryggeriarbejder 
 Arne Skovhus as Arbejdsformidler 
 Kim Sagild as En drømmemand 
 Ulrich Breuning as Madsen

External links
 

1980s Danish-language films
1980 films
1980 drama films
Danish drama films